Refutation of Helvetius  is a work composed in 1773 by Denis Diderot. It contains a rebuttal to some of the arguments made by Helvétius in his posthumously published work De l'Homme (On Man).

Background
Helvetius, a friend of Diderot, was a freethinker; many of his views were also the views of Diderot. The two shared a common acceptance of philosophical materialism, and in many respects their views on metaphysics were identical. The fundamental disagreement boiled down to a few issues on which Diderot was in vehement disagreement with Helvetius. First, Helvetius proposed that human behavior is indistinguishable from animal behavior since both humans and animals obtain knowledge through the five senses. Here, Diderot agreed with Helvetius that humans are a species of animals, and animals are not automata; however, he completely disagreed with the view that studying animal behavior can yield insights into human behavior.

Additionally, Helvetius was an environmentalist of an extreme kind. According to Helvetius everything about a human's development may be ascribed to the environment.  Helvetius also did not distinguish between sensations and judgement. Diderot was opposed to these views.

References

Denis Diderot